Afonso Celso Garcia Reis (born in Marília, 3 September 1947), best known as Afonsinho, is a former association footballer. 

He started his career in 1962 playing for XV de Jaú, and in 1965 for Botafogo. He also played for Olaria, Santos, América Mineiro, Madureira, Flamengo and Fluminense.

Four decades after Fausto, at the zenith of the military dictatorship in Brazil in 1971 he succeeded in becoming the first Brazilian footballer to obtain in practice in Brazil the right to change his employer/team when and if he wanted, with no need for an agent or the approval of his former employer, and without suffering professional reprisals. A movie documentary called "" was made by Oswaldo Caldeira about the subject in 1974.

External links

 Profile at Globo Esporte's Futpedia
 article about him in a Brazilian weekly magazine; December 2008 in Portuguese

1947 births
Living people
People from Marília
Brazilian footballers
Association football midfielders
Esporte Clube XV de Novembro (Jaú) players
Botafogo de Futebol e Regatas players
Fluminense FC players
Olaria Atlético Clube players
Santos FC players
América Futebol Clube (MG) players
Madureira Esporte Clube players
Footballers from São Paulo (state)